This is a list of notable events in music that took place in the year 1960.

Specific locations
1960 in British music
1960 in Norwegian music

Specific genres
1960 in country music
1960 in jazz

Events
January – Stuart Sutcliffe joins the Liverpool band Johnny and the Moondogs and suggests they change their name to the Beatals; after several variations this settles on The Beatles in August.
January 14 – Elvis Presley is promoted to Sergeant in the United States Army.
January 25 – The National Association of Broadcasters in the United States reacts to the payola scandal by threatening fines for any disc jockeys accepting money for playing particular records.
February 6 – Songwriter Jesse Belvin dies in an automobile accident in Los Angeles; he is co-author of "Earth Angel", The Penguins' classic from 1954.
February 23 – United States Army Old Guard Fife and Drum Corps formed.
March 5 – Elvis Presley returns home from serving in the U.S. Army in Germany, having stopped off on March 2 at Glasgow Prestwick Airport, his only time in the U.K.
March 15 – Jussi Björling suffers a heart attack before a performance at the Royal Opera House, Covent Garden, London. He goes on to perform, but dies six months later in Sweden.
March 29 – The 5th Eurovision Song Contest, held at the Royal Festival Hall, London, is won by France with the song "Tom Pillibi", sung by Jacqueline Boyer.
Spring – "Skokiaan" by Bill Haley & His Comets becomes the band's final single to make it onto the American sales charts (with the exception of a 1974 reissue of "Rock Around the Clock").
April 1 – Frank Sinatra, Sammy Davis Jr., Elvis Presley, Dean Martin and Mitch Miller film Sinatra's Timex Special for ABC at Miami, Florida's Fountainbleu Hotel.
April 2 – The National Association of Recording Merchandisers presents its first annual awards in Las Vegas, Nevada.
April 4 – RCA Victor Records announces that it will release all pop singles in mono and stereo simultaneously, the first record company to do so. Elvis Presley's single "Stuck on You" is RCA's first mono/stereo release.
April 17 – Eddie Cochran, Gene Vincent and Cochran's girlfriend Sharon Sheeley are injured in a car accident near Chippenham in England. Cochran dies in a hospital in Bath, Somerset, from severe brain injuries. Police officer David Harman, who attends the incident, starts learning to play the guitar using Cochran's impounded Gretsch, later becoming professional musician Dave Dee.
April 20 – Elvis Presley returns to Hollywood for the first time since coming home from Germany to film G.I. Blues.
May 2 – The Drifters' Ben E. King leaves the group and signs a solo record contract with ATCO Records.
May 20–28 – The Beatles, as the Silver Beetles (uncredited), play their first ever tour, as a backing group for Johnny Gentle on a tour of Scotland. The lineup comprises John Lennon, Paul McCartney, George Harrison, Stuart Sutcliffe and Tommy Moore.
June 30 – Opening of Lionel Bart's Oliver! in London's West End.
July – The Shadows' instrumental Apache is released in the U.K.
July 30 – "Battle of Beaulieu": At an English jazz festival at Beaulieu, Hampshire, fans of trad jazz come to blows with progressives.
August 17 – The Beatles make their debut under this name in Hamburg, Germany, beginning a 48-night residency at the Indra club. The band at the time comprises John Lennon, Paul McCartney, George Harrison, Stu Sutcliffe on bass and Pete Best on drums.
August 27 – Last radio broadcast of Louisiana Hayride.
October – Dion DiMucci splits from Dion and The Belmonts.
October 16 – A single concert at the Donaueschingen Festival premieres Penderecki's Anaklasis and Messiaen's Chronochromie.
November 13 – Sammy Davis Jr. marries May Britt.
December – Édith Piaf's recording of "Non, je ne regrette rien" is released in France.
The last 78 rpm records are released in the U.S. and the U.K.
English rock musician Ritchie Blackmore's musical career begins.
Renato Carosone announces his retirement, at the height of his popularity.
Dalida and Charles Aznavour share the Grand Prix Award for best Italian song.
Ian Lake launches the Music of our Time Festival in London for hitherto unknown composers.
Indian santoor player Shivkumar Sharma records his first solo album.
14-year-old Neil Young founds The Jades with Ken Koblun.

Albums released
A Date with the Everly Brothers – The Everly Brothers
A Portrait of Duke Ellington – Dizzy Gillespie
Alone With Dion – Dion
At Last! – Etta James
At Newport 1960 – Muddy Waters
Around Midnight – Julie London
The Best Of The Crests – The Crests
Bill Haley and His Comets – Bill Haley & His Comets
Bing & Satchmo – Bing Crosby and Louis Armstrong
Bo Diddley In the Spotlight – Bo Diddley
Bo Diddley Is a Gunslinger – Bo Diddley
Boss Tenor – Gene Ammons
Broadway Playbill – The Hi-Lo's
Change of the Century – Ornette Coleman
The Crests Sing All Biggies – The Crests
Ella in Berlin: Mack the Knife – Ella Fitzgerald
Ella Fitzgerald Sings Songs from "Let No Man Write My Epitaph" – Ella Fitzgerald
Ella Wishes You a Swinging Christmas – Ella Fitzgerald
Elvis Is Back! – Elvis Presley
Les enfants du Pirée – Dalida
Everything Goes!!! – The Four Lads
Fiorello! – Oscar Peterson
For the Young at Heart – Perry Como
The Genius Hits the Road – Ray Charles
G.I. Blues – Elvis Presley
Giant Steps – John Coltrane
Haley's Juke Box – Bill Haley & His Comets
Have Guitar Will Travel – Bo Diddley
Hello, Love – Ella Fitzgerald
His Hand in Mine – Elvis Presley
I Gotta Right to Swing – Sammy Davis Jr.
It's Everly Time – The Everly Brothers
Jo + Jazz – Jo Stafford
Joan Baez – Joan Baez
Julie...At Home – Julie London
Just a Closer Walk with Thee – Patti Page
The Last Month of the Year – The Kingston Trio
Me and My Shadows – Cliff Richard & The Shadows
More Songs by Ricky – Ricky Nelson
Nice 'n' Easy – Frank Sinatra
No Cover, No Minimum – Billy Eckstine
Now, There Was a Song! – Johnny Cash
Once More with Feeling – Billy Eckstine
Portrait in Jazz – Bill Evans Trio
Pre Bird – Charles Mingus
Ride This Train – Johnny Cash
Rockin' at the Hops – Chuck Berry
Show Time – Doris Day
Sketches of Spain – Miles Davis
Sings Hank Williams – Johnny Cash
Sold Out – The Kingston Trio
String Along – The Kingston Trio
Swingin' on the Moon – Mel Tormé
The Brothers Four – The Brothers Four
The Two of Us – Brook Benton and Dinah Washington
This Is...Brenda – Brenda Lee
The Village of St. Bernadette – Andy Williams
We Insist! – Max Roach
What Every Girl Should Know – Doris Day
Where The Boys Are – Connie Francis
Wish Upon a Star with Dion & the Belmonts – Dion and the Belmonts

Biggest hit singles
The following singles achieved the highest chart positions in 1960.

Top hits on record

Published popular music
 "Ain't That a Kick in the Head?" – words: Sammy Cahn, music: Jimmy Van Heusen
 "Alley-Oop" – words and music: Dallas Frazier
 "Apache" – m. Jerry Lordan
 "As Long as He Needs Me" – w.m. Lionel Bart from the musical Oliver!
 "Bonanza!" – w.m. Jay Livingston & Ray Evans
 "Calcutta" – w. Lee Pockriss & Paul Vance m. Heino Gaze
 "Calendar Girl" – w. Howard Greenfield m. Neil Sedaka
 "Camelot" – w. Alan Jay Lerner m. Frederick Loewe. Introduced by Richard Burton in the musical of the same name
 "Cathy's Clown" – w.m. The Everly Brothers
 "Chain Gang" – w.m. Sam Cooke
 "Everybody's Somebody's Fool" – w. Howard Greenfield m. Jack Keller
 "Good Timin'" – w.m. Fred Tobias & Clint Ballard Jr.
 "Goodness Gracious Me" – D. Lee, H. Kretzmer
 "He Will Break Your Heart" – w.m. Jerry Butler, Calvin Carter & Curtis Mayfield
 "Hey, Look Me Over" – w. Carolyn Leigh m. Cy Coleman. Introduced by Lucille Ball in the musical Wildcat
 "I Gotta Know" – w.m. Paul Evans & Matt Williams
 "I Want to Be Wanted" – w. (Eng) Kim Gannon (Ital) A. Testa m. Pino Spotti
 "I'd Do Anything" – w.m. Lionel Bart
 "I'll Be There" – w.m. Bobby Darin
 "I'm Sorry" – w.m. Ronnie Self & Dub Allbritten
 "If Ever I Would Leave You" – w. Alan Jay Lerner m. Frederick Loewe. Introduced by Robert Goulet in the musical Camelot
 "Irma La Douce" – w. (Eng) Julian More, David Heneker & Monty Norman (Fr) Alexandre Breffort m. Marguerite Monnot
 "It's Now or Never" – w.m. adapt. Aaron Schroeder & Wally Gold
 "Itsy Bitsy Teenie Weenie Yellow Polkadot Bikini" – w. Paul Vance & Lee Pockriss m. Brian Hyland
 "Last Date" – m. Floyd Cramer
 "Little Boy Lost" – w.m. Johnny Ashcroft & Tony Withers
 "A Million to One" – w.m. Phil Medley
 "Mister Custer" – w.m. Fred Darian, Al De Lory & Joseph Van Winkle
 "Money (That's What I Want)" – w.m. Janie Bradford & Berry Gordy Jr.
 "Mountain of Love" – w.m. Harold Dorman
 "My Heart Has a Mind of Its Own" – w. Howard Greenfield m. Jack Keller
 "Never on Sunday" – w. (Eng) Billy Towne (Greek) Manos Hadjidakis m. Manos Hadjidakis
 "North to Alaska" – w.m. Mike Phillips
 "Only the Lonely" – w.m. Roy Orbison & Joe Melson
 "Please Don't Tease" – B. Welch, P. Chester
 "Please Help Me, I'm Falling" – w.m. Don Robertson & Hal Blair
 "Poetry in Motion" – w.m. Paul Kauffman & Mike Anthony
 "Puppy Love" – w.m. Paul Anka
 "Rubber Ball" – w.m. Anne Orlowski & Aaron Schroeder
 "Run Samson Run" – w. Howard Greenfield m. Neil Sedaka
 "Sailor" – w. (Eng) Alan Holt (Ger) Fini Busch m. 
 "Save the Last Dance for Me" – w.m. Doc Pomus & Mort Shuman
 "The Second Time Around" – w. Sammy Cahn m. Jimmy Van Heusen. Introduced by Bing Crosby in the film High Time.
 "She Wears My Ring" – w.m. Felice and Boudleaux Bryant
 "Sink the Bismark" – w.m. Tillman Franks & Johnny Horton
 "Sixteen Reasons" – w.m. Bill Post & Doree Post
 "Soon It's Gonna Rain" – w. Tom Jones m. Harvey Schmidt
 "Spanish Harlem" – Jerry Leiber, Phil Spector
 "Stairway to Heaven" – w. Howard Greenfield m. Neil Sedaka
 "Stay" – w.m. Maurice Williams
 "Stuck on You" – w.m. Aaron Schroeder & J. Leslie McFarland
 "A Taste of Honey" – w. Ric Marlow m. Bobby Scott
 "Tell Laura I Love Her" – w.m. Jeff Barry & Ben Raleigh
 "Theme from A Summer Place" – m. Max Steiner
 "Tie Me Kangaroo Down, Sport" – w.m. Rolf Harris
 "Try to Remember" – w. Tom Jones m. Harvey Schmidt
 "The Twist" – w.m. Hank Ballard
 "Walk, Don't Run" – w.m. Johnny Smith
 "Walking to New Orleans" – w.m. Bobby Charles
 "When Will I Be Loved" – w.m. Phil Everly
 "Wild One" – w.m. Bernie Lowe, Kal Mann & Dave Appell
 "Will You Love Me Tomorrow" – Carole King, Gerry Goffin
 "Wings of a Dove" – Robert B. "Bob" Ferguson, Sr.
 "Wooden Heart" – w.m. adapt. Fred Wise, Ben Weisman, Kay Twomey & Bert Kaempfert
 "(In The Summertime) You Don't Want My Love" – w.m. Roger Miller
 "You Talk Too Much" – w.m. Joe Jones & Reginald Hall
 "You're Sixteen" – w.m. Richard M. Sherman & Robert B. Sherman

Other notable songs
"Al Watan Al Akbar" – w.m. Mohammed Abdel Wahab
"Dance of the Yi People" (instrumental) by Wang Huiran
"Et maintenant" – w. Pierre Delanoë m. Gilbert Bécaud
"Nous les amoureux" – w. Maurice Vidalin m. Jacques Datin
"Pyar Kiya To Darna Kiya" – w.m. Naushad Ali
"Saba you rise from the ocean" – w.m. Christina Maria Jeurissen
"Uno dei tanti" – w. Mogol m. Carlo Donida Labati
"La Vache à mille francs" – w.m. Jean Poiret

Classical music

Premieres

Compositions
William Alwyn – Piano Concerto No. 2
Malcolm Arnold – Symphony No. 4
Henk Badings – Symphonic Variations
Luciano Berio
Circles for female voice, harp and two percussionists
Momenti for tape
Benjamin Britten – Cello Sonata in C major
Elliott Carter – String Quartet No. 2
Mario Davidovsky – Contrastes No. 1 for string orchestra and electronic sounds
Lukas Foss
Concerto, for five improvising instruments
Time Cycle, for soprano and orchestra
Alberto Ginastera – Cantata para América Mágica
Sofia Gubaidulina – Serenade for solo guitar
Bernard Herrmann – Psycho (film score)
Wojciech Kilar – Herbsttag for female voice and string quartet
Olivier Messiaen – Chronochromie
Krzysztof Penderecki
Anaklasis for 42 string instruments and percussion
Threnody for the Victims of Hiroshima
Walter Piston – Symphony No. 7
Francis Poulenc – Gloria (written)
Dmitri Shostakovich –
String Quartet No. 7 in E flat major, Op.108
String Quartet No. 8 in C minor, Op.110
Karlheinz Stockhausen
 Carré, for 4 orchestras and choirs
 Kontakte, for piano, percussion and electronic sounds, or electronic sounds alone
Igor Stravinsky – Movements, for piano and orchestra
Virgil Thomson – Missa Pro Defunctis
William Walton – Symphony No. 2
Mieczysław Weinberg – Sinfonietta No. 2
La Monte Young – Compositions 1960

Opera
Henk Badings – Martin Korda
Benjamin Britten – A Midsummer Night's Dream (premiered on June 11 at the Aldeburgh Festival; the rôle of Oberon is sung by the countertenor Alfred Deller for whom it is written)
Du Mingxin – Women Generals of the Yangs
Lukas Foss – Introductions and Goodbyes (a nine-minute opera, libretto by Gian Carlo Menotti, composed 1959, premiered on May 5, 1960)
Hans Werner Henze – Der Prinz von Homburg (composed 1958, premiered on May 22, 1960)

Jazz

Musical theater
 Beg, Borrow or Steal (Bud Freeman) and (Leon Pober) – Broadway production opened at the Martin Beck Theatre on February 10 and ran for 5 performances.
 Bye Bye Birdie (Lee Adams and Charles Strouse) – Broadway production opened at the Martin Beck Theatre on April 14 and ran for 607 performances
 Camelot (Alan Jay Lerner and Frederick Loewe) – Broadway production opened at the Majestic Theatre on December 3 and ran for 873 performances
Christine – Broadway production opened at the 46th Street Theatre on April 28 and ran for 12 performances
 Do Re Mi – Broadway production opened at the St. James Theatre on December 26 and ran for 400 performances
 The Fantasticks – Off-Broadway production opened at the Sullivan Street Playhouse on May 3 and runs for 17,162 performances (42 years)
 Flower Drum Song (Rodgers & Hammerstein) – London production opened at the Palace Theatre on March 24 and ran for 464 performances
 From A to Z – Broadway revue opened at the Plymouth Theatre on April 20 and ran for 21 performances
 Greenwillow – Broadway production opened at the Alvin Theatre on March 8 and ran for 97 performances
 Hooray for Daisy – London production opened at the Lyric, Hammersmith on December 20. Starring Eleanor Drew and Robin Hunter.
 Irma La Douce – Broadway production opened at the Plymouth Theatre on September 29 and ran for 524 performances
 Oh, Kay! – Off-Broadway revival opened at the East 74th Street Theatre on April 16 and ran for 119 performances. Starring Linda Lavin, Penny Fuller, and Marti Stevens, and with high school student Daniel Lewis working a follow spot in the lighting.
 Oliver! (Lionel Bart) – London production opened at the New Theatre on June 30 and ran for 2618 performances
 Parade – Broadway revue opened at the Players' Theatre on January 20 and ran for 95 performances
 Tenderloin – Broadway production opened at the 46th Street Theatre on October 17 and ran for 216 performances.
 The Unsinkable Molly Brown (Meredith Willson) – Broadway production opened at the Winter Garden Theatre on November 3 and ran for 532 performances
 Valmouth – Off-Broadway production opened at the York Playhouse on October 6 and ran for 14 performances
 Wildcat – Broadway production opened at the Alvin Theater on December 16 and ran for 171 performances

Musical films
Barsaat Ki Raat Bollywood films starring Madhubala
Bells Are Ringing (Vincente Minnelli)starring Judy Holliday, Dean Martin and Eddie Foy Jr.
Can-Can (Walter Lang) starring Frank Sinatra, Shirley MacLaine, Maurice Chevalier, Louis Jourdan and Juliet Prowse
 Cinderfella (Frank Tashlin) starring Jerry Lewis
 G.I. Blues (Norman Taurog) starring Elvis Presley and Juliet Prowse
 High Time (Blake Edwards) starring Bing Crosby, Fabian Forte, Tuesday Weld and Yvonne Craig.
 Let's Make Love (George Cukor) starring Marilyn Monroe, Yves Montand and Frankie Vaughan

Births
January 3 – Mikuláš Škuta, pianist and composer
January 4
Art Paul Schlosser, singer-songwriter
Michael Stipe, lead singer for the rock band R.E.M.
January 8 – Dave Weckl, jazz fusion drummer
January 20 – Scott Thunes, bass player (Frank Zappa band)
January 22 – Michael Hutchence, Australian vocalist, songwriter and actor for INXS (d. 1997)
January 26 – Charlie Gillingham (Counting Crows)
January 29 – Cho-Liang Lin, Taiwanese-American violinist
January 31 – George Benjamin, composer
February 3 – Tim Chandler (Daniel Amos, The Swirling Eddies)
February 4 – Tim Booth, British rock singer (James)
February 7 – Steve Bronski, born Steve Forrest, synth-pop keyboardist (d. 2021)
February 18 – Gazebo, singer
February 19 – Holly Johnson, singer (Frankie Goes to Hollywood)
February 20 – Kee Marcello, Swedish rock guitarist (Easy Action, Europe)
February 27 – Paul Humphreys (Orchestral Manoeuvres in the Dark)
March 4 – Thierry Pastor, French singer
March 12 – Maki Nomiya, Japanese singer (Pizzicato Five)
March 13 – Adam Clayton, bassist of rock band U2
April 4 – Jane Eaglen, Wagnerian soprano
April 10 – Fabio Golfetti, Brazilian musician and record producer (Violeta de Outono, Gong)
April 21 – John Maher, drummer for Buzzcocks, Flag of Convenience, The Invisible Girls
April 23
Steve Clark, English guitarist (Def Leppard) (d. 1991)
David Gedge, English musician (The Wedding Present and Cinerama)
April 26 – Roger Taylor, English rock musician (Duran Duran)
May 6 – John Flansburgh, American rock musician (They Might Be Giants)
May 8 – Eric Brittingham, American bass player (Cinderella and Naked Beggars)
May 10
Bono, lead singer of U2
Kimmo Nevonmaa, Finnish contemporary music composer (d. 1996)
May 27 – Alexander Bashlachev, Russian singer (d. 1988)
June 1 – Simon Gallup, bassist of The Cure
June 2 – Tony Hadley, vocalist of Spandau Ballet
June 6 – Steve Vai, American guitarist (David Lee Roth)
June 8
Mick Hucknall, English vocalist of Simply Red
Terje Gewelt, Norwegian bassist
June 10 – Mark-Anthony Turnage, composer
June 14 – Gary Husband, drummer, pianist and composer
June 20 – John Taylor, bassist of Duran Duran
June 22 – Alexander Shchetynsky, composer
June 24 – Siedah Garrett, American singer-songwriter and pianist (Brand New Heavies)
June 26 – Zachary Breaux, American jazz guitarist (d. 1997)
July 3 – Vince Clarke, English rock songwriter (Depeche Mode, Yazoo, Erasure)
July 11 – David Baerwald American singer-songwriter (David & David)
July 14 – Kyle Gass, American music singer-songwriter-guitarist/actor
July 22
John Prior, Australian composer-producer-drummer (Matt Finish)
Jon Oliva, American vocalist and pianist (Savatage)
July 23 – Billy Rutherford, Scottish singer-songwriter, musician and record producer (Riders of the Dark)
July 28 – Chris Reece, drummer (Social Distortion)
August 1 – Chuck D (Public Enemy)
August 2
Neal Morse, American singer and keyboard player (Spock's Beard, Transatlantic, Yellow Matter Custard, and Flying Colors)
David Yow, American singer-songwriter (Scratch Acid, The Jesus Lizard, and Qui)
August 7 – Jacquie O'Sullivan, Bananarama
August 15 – Karlheinz Essl Jr., Austrian composer, performer, sound artist, improviser, and composition teacher
August 17 – Johnny Wright (music manager), American music manager and a president/CEO of the Wright Entertainment Group (WEG).
August 23 – Chris Potter, Canadian actor and musician
August 26 – Branford Marsalis, African American jazz musician
August 30 – Chalino Sánchez, Mexican musician (d. 1992)
August 31 – Chris Whitley, singer-songwriter (d. 2005)
September 1 – Joseph Williams, singer and film composer
September 4 – Kim Thayil, Soundgarden
September 5 – Karita Mattila, operatic soprano
September 8 – David Steele, Fine Young Cannibals
September 9 – Stefano Righi, Italian singer-songwriter, musician and composer. Righeira
September 24 – Amy Sky, Canadian singer-songwriter, record producer, theatre actress, and television host.
September 29 – Alan McGee, British music industry mogul and musician
October 7 – Kyosuke Himuro, Japanese singer (Boøwy)
October 13 – Joey Belladonna, born Joseph Bellardini, American thrash metal vocalist (Anthrax)
October 19 – Dan Woodgate, English drummer Madness
October 22 – Cris Kirkwood, Meat Puppets
November 12 – Ismo Alanko, Finnish singer-songwriter (Hassisen Kone, Sielun Veljet, and Ismo Alanko Säätiö)
November 14 – Tom Judson, American musical theatre actor
November 15 – Keith Washington, American singer
November 18 – Kim Wilde, English pop singer, author, DJ, television presenter and gardener (daughter of Marty Wilde)
November 19 – Matt Sorum, American drummer (Guns N' Roses, Velvet Revolver, The Cult)
November 25 – Amy Grant, American Christian singer-songwriter and actress
December 2 – Rick Savage (Def Leppard)
December 5 – Osvaldo Golijov, composer
December 22 – Mark Brydon, English musician (Moloko)
December 27 – Fred Hammond, African American gospel musician
date unknown
Phil Cunningham, folk musician
Greg Flesch (Daniel Amos, The Swirling Eddies)
Diane Meredith Belcher, American concert organist, teacher and church musician
Priti Paintal, East Indian composer, performer, music producer and promoter

Deaths
January 2 – Leila Megane, mezzo-soprano, 68
January 5 – Jakob van Domselaer, composer, 69
January 18 – Gladys Bentley, blues singer, 52 (pneumonia)
January 24 – Edwin Fischer, pianist and conductor, 73
January 25 – Rutland Boughton, composer, 82
February 2 – Jenő Huszka, composer of operettas, 84
February 3
Ace Brigode, bandleader, 67
Fred Buscaglione, Italian singer, musician and songwriter, 38 (car accident)
February 6 – Jesse Belvin, singer, pianist and songwriter, 27 (car accident)
February 9 – Ernő Dohnányi, pianist, conductor and composer, 82
February 12 – Bobby Clark, US comedian and singer, 71
March 4 – Leonard Warren, baritone, operatic baritone (cerebral hemorrhage)
March 16 – Billy Garland, blues guitarist, singer and songwriter, 41 (car accident)
March 30 – Fabian Andre, composer, 50
April 10 – Arthur Benjamin, composer, 66
April 17 – Eddie Cochran, rock & roll singer, 21 (road accident)
April 24 – Carl Braun, operatic bass, 73
May 8 – Hugo Alfvén, violinist, conductor and composer, 88
May 12 – Cecil Armstrong Gibbs, composer, 70
May 13 – Gid Tanner, country music star, 74
May 14 – Lucrezia Bori, operatic soprano, 72
July 18 – Foster Reynolds, instrument manufacturer, 75 (heart attack at work)
July 24
Hans Albers, actor and singer, 69
Louise Gunning, singer, Broadway and vaudeville, 81
August 9 – Louis Cahuzac, clarinetist and composer, 80
August 23 – Oscar Hammerstein II, librettist and director of many musicals, 65
September 1 – Aunt Molly Jackson, folk singer and union activist, c. 80
September 3 – Joseph Lamb, ragtime composer, 72
September 5 – Oliphant Chuckerbutty, organist and composer, 75
September 8 – Oscar Pettiford, American jazz musician and composer, 37
September 9 – Jussi Björling, operatic tenor, 49 (heart attack)
September 13 – Leo Weiner, music teacher, 75
September 24 – Mátyás Seiber, composer, 55 (car accident)
October 19 – Günter Raphael, composer, 57
October 20 – Denise Orme, music hall performer, 75
October 30 – Alfred Hill, composer and conductor, 90
November 2 – Dimitris Mitropoulos, pianist, conductor and composer, 64
November 5 – Johnny Horton, American country singer, 35 (car accident)
December 4 – Walter Goehr, composer, 57
December 7 – Clara Haskil, pianist, 65
December 10 – Mado Robin, singer, 41 (cancer)
Date unknown
Lawrence Duhé (b. 1887), jazz musician
Lorenzo Herrera (b. 1896), singer and composer
Jacobo Rubalcaba (b. 1895), musician and bandleader

Awards

Grammy Awards
Record of the Year: "Theme From A Summer Place" – Percy Faith
Album of the Year: The Button-Down Mind of Bob Newhart – Bob Newhart
Song of the Year: – "Theme From Exodus" – Ernest Gold, songwriter

Eurovision Song Contest
Eurovision Song Contest 1960

Pulitzer Prize for Music
Elliott Carter – String Quartet No. 2

References

 
20th century in music
Music by year